Hitler über Deutschland (English: Hitler over Germany) was the name of a campaign stunt and film for Hitler's run in the 1932 German presidential election. During this tour Hitler would visit as many as five cities in one day, addressing rallies of tens of thousands of people.

Afterwards the tour was made into a silent film and photographs taken by Heinrich Hoffmann were published in a photobook. It was an inexpensive booklet that was printed in 500,000 copies.

References

External links 

Excerpts from the book
Hitler über Deutschland  at Filmarchives online
Clips of the film from the US Holocaust Museum

1932 documentary films
1932 films
1932 non-fiction books
1932 in Germany
Nazi propaganda films
Films of the Weimar Republic
German silent feature films
German documentary films
German black-and-white films
Books of photographs
1930s German films